The Lola A1GP was a vehicle designed to compete in the A1 Grand Prix. The car was standardised for every team to provide a level playing field for competing nations. It was designed to reduce the volume of "dirty air", allowing drivers to close in on the car in front, encouraging overtaking. The bodywork was mainly pre-impregnated carbon fibre composites. From 2008–09 Ferrari was consulted on the design and manufacture for all A1 Grand Prix cars. Lola A1GP the car replaced in the 2008-2009 season A1GP Powered by Ferrari car.

Design
The Lola A1GP was the spec car used by the series from the 2005–06 season to the 2007–08 season. It was powered by Zytek engines, and ran on Cooper tyres. The former chassis is now used in the Euroseries 3000, starting in 2009.

Chassis
The chassis, designated Lola A1GP is made and designed by Lola Cars. The A1 Car's carbon fibre skin cloaks a core of aluminium honeycomb. Based on bionic engineering principles found in nature, the hexagonal honeycomb provides remarkable strength for its weight, and has progressive deformation properties in response to an impact, which contributes to driver safety. In addition, drivers are protected by FIA-approved side intrusion panels that protect them from lateral impacts.

Engine
The engine for the cars was developed by Zytek Engineering. The 3.4-litre V8 unit is capable of delivering 520 bhp (550 bhp in PowerBoost mode). Each engine must be very durable, as it must last a whole season. The engine only weighs 120 kilograms, making it one of the lightest 3.4-litre engines ever made.

Technical specifications
The car has an overall length of 4833 mm, with a long wheelbase of 3000 mm and a wide track of 1476 mm (front) and  1468 mm (rear). Its total weight amounts to 615 kilograms, without the driver and the fuel.

Engine type:  	ZA1348
Configuration: 	90 degree V8
Displacement: 	3400 cc
Width: 	619 mm
Height: 	542 mm
Length: 	543 mm
Weight: 	120 kg
Cylinder block: 	Sand cast aluminium alloy
Cylinder head: 	Sand cast aluminium alloy
Valvetrain: 	4 overhead camshafts 4 valves per Cylinder
Engine Management: 	Zytek EMS 4.6.1
Ignition: 	Zytek DCDI with coil over plug
Spark plugs: 	NGK
Fuel: 	100 octane rating 70% + Ethanol E30 30%
Max Torque: 	330 lbf·ft (442 N·m)
Max power: 	520-550 bhp (388-410 kW)
Max speed:     300 km/h

Suspension
The front and rear suspension is of a double wishbone and pushrod operated twin coil over damper construction. Adjustable ride height, cambers and toe, as well as anti-dive and anti-squat made to optimise drive control.

Clutch
A two-piece carbon clutch was tailored especially for the car to handle  and the two racing starts per weekend. The unit combines lightweight construction with durability and reliability. The A1 car's gearchange is by an electronically controlled paddle-shifting via a six-speed paddle-shift semi-automatic sequential transmission

PowerBoost
When used at the right time, this feature can encourage overtaking. For the PowerBoost to activate, the throttle position must be above 80% and the speed more than 60 km/h. The button must also be depressed to continue on PowerBoost mode. However, the PowerBoost automatically deactivates itself if the throttle falls below 40%. Each driver only has a limited number of uses of the PowerBoost function. The driver can only use it four times in a sprint race and eight times in a feature race. Once these maximum allocated uses of the PowerBoost have been used, the system is disabled until the end of the race, after which Zytek engineers reset the system for the next race.

Tyres
A1 Grand Prix uses slick tyres on normal dry races. Pneumatics were supplied exclusively by Cooper Tires.

Fuel
A1 Grand Prix uses 100 RON Biofuel for all cars.

References 

A1GP
Open wheel racing cars